Riding with Buffalo Bill is a 1954 American Western Serial film directed by Spencer Gordon Bennet and starring Marshall Reed.

Plot
Buffalo Bill Cody comes to aid the miner Rocky Ford and a group of ranchers in their defeat of a local crime lord, King Carney, who is trying to keep the new railroad out of the territory in order to carry on with his illegal operations. Rocky then asks Cody to don the disguise of a legendary masked man, known as The Ridin' Terror, who once before smashed outlaw rule in the area. In response, Cody enlists the support of Rocky, the settler Reb Morgan and his sister Ruth, and plans offensive strategy to eradicate Carney and his outlaws.

Cast
 Marshall Reed as Bill Cody, aka The Riding' Terror
 Rick Vallin as Reb Morgan
 Joanne Rio as Maria Perez [ch 7-11, 14-15]
 Shirley Whitney as Ruth Morgan
 Jack Ingram as Henchman Ace''''
 William Fawcett as Rocky Ford 
 Gregg Barton as Henchman Bart
 Edward Coch as Jose Perez [ch 7-11, 14-15] (as Ed Coch)
 Steven Ritch as Henchman Elko [ch 5] (as Steve Ritch)
 Pierce Lyden as Henchman Darr
 Michael Fox as King Carney 
 Lee Roberts as Zeke

Chapter titles
 The Ridin' Terror from St. Joe
 Law of the Six Gun
 Raiders from Ghost Town
 Cody to the Rescue
 Midnight Marauders
 Under the Avalanche
 Night Attack
 Trapped in the Powder Shack
 Into an Outlaw Trap
 Blast of Oblivion
 The Depths of the Earth
 The Ridin' Terror
 Trapped in the Apache Mine
 Railroad Wreckers
 Law Comes to the West
Source:

See also
 List of American films of 1954
 List of film serials by year
 List of film serials by studio

References

External links

Cinefania.com

1954 films
Cultural depictions of Buffalo Bill
American black-and-white films
1950s English-language films
Columbia Pictures film serials
Films directed by Spencer Gordon Bennet
1954 Western (genre) films
American Western (genre) films
Films with screenplays by George H. Plympton
1950s American films